Scaevola albida, commonly known as pale fan-flower or small-fruit fan-flower, is a flowering plant in the family Goodeniaceae. It is a spreading perennial herb with pale blue or white fan-shaped flowers and obovate leaves. It grows in Queensland through eastern New South Wales and coastal areas of Victoria and Tasmania.

Description

Taxonomy and naming
Scaevola albida was first formally described in 1917 and the description was published in The Botanical Exchange Club and Society of the British Isles.The specific epithet (albida) means "white".

Distribution and habitat
Pale fan-flower grows near coastal scrubland, grassy headlands and ranges in New South Wales, Tasmania, South Australia, Victoria and Queensland.

References

albida
Flora of New South Wales
Flora of Queensland
Flora of South Australia
Flora of Tasmania
Flora of Victoria (Australia)